Antennablennius velifer is a species of combtooth blenny which is found in the western Indian Ocean. Some authorities regard this taxon as a junior synonym of Antennablennius variopunctatus.

References

velifer
Fish described in 1959